The Equity Project (TEP) Charter School is a 480-student, 5th through 8th grade New York City charter middle school in the Manhattan neighborhood of Inwood.

Background

TEP was founded in 2009 by Zeke Vanderhoek, a Yale graduate and former middle school teacher. Prior to founding TEP, Zeke was the founder and chairman of the educational company Manhattan Prep. In 2013, The New York State Education Department unconditionally renewed TEP's charter through 2018.

Model

TEP focuses on teaching disadvantaged students. TEP pays teachers an annual salary of $125,000, with the opportunity to achieve a performance bonus.

Student Body

TEP students are admitted through a lottery system that gives preference to students receiving free or reduced priced lunches, English Language Learners, and those receiving special education services. In 2013–14, 86% of students were free lunch eligible, 21% were English Language Learners, and 18% received special education services. The student body was 90% Latino, 8% Black, and 1% White.

Faculty

The school's faculty consists of 50 full-time employees, 32 of which are teachers. TEP offers high teacher salaries by reducing administrative costs in the following areas:

 Each TEP teacher leads a grade level, program, or project
 TEP's instructional supervisors are also teachers. TEP's Assistant Principal is the school's 8th grade math teacher. TEP's Principal teaches a 7th grade class.
 TEP does not incur significant personnel costs for extended-day and other student activities, which are led and staffed by TEP teachers.
 TEP does not incur significant professional development fees. TEP conducts a one-week faculty-led staff development institute prior to the start of each trimester

School Day and Academic Calendar

TEP operates on a year-round academic trimester schedule and instructs students in six subjects: English, math, science, social studies, physical education/health, and music. Students attend school from 7:45am – 4pm, approximately one hour and 45 minutes longer than the typical New York City school day. TEP is focused on providing students with depth in the discipline of music. Every student receives 45 minutes of daily instruction in music literacy, history, and performance. TEP students also receive 45 minutes of daily physical education. TEP offers a variety of athletics and enrichment opportunities, including competitive sports teams and clubs in the areas of academics, student governance, and the arts.

Results and Outside Evaluation

In October 2014, Mathematica Policy Research released the results of a four-year study of TEP. The report found that students who attended TEP for four years achieved test score gains equal to an additional 1.6 years of school in math, 0.6 years in science, and 0.4 years in English.

Press

TEP has been featured in various media outlets for its organizational model and results, including these articles:
 Wall Street Journal:The Equity Project Charter School Gets a Big Backer Charter School Boasts Big Pay and Big Results
 The Los Angeles Times: Investing in teacher pay could spur big gains for California students
 The New York Times: Next Test: Value of $125,000-a-Year Teachers
 60 Minutes: NYC charter school's $125,000 experiment
 The Huffington Post: How Test Prep Is Done in One Washington Heights Charter School
 The Huffington Post: High-Demand Charter School: Staying the Course in Washington Heights

References

Charter schools in New York City
Public middle schools in Manhattan
Inwood, Manhattan
2009 establishments in New York City